The following is a listing of the documentation available for Pearl Harbor Naval Base, now part of Joint Base Pearl Harbor–Hickam on the Hawaiian island of Oahu, through the public-domain Historic American Buildings Survey (HABS) and the Historic American Engineering Record (HAER). See separate lists for Hickam Air Force Base, the former Barbers Point Naval Air Station, and Schofield Barracks. All locations are on the U.S. Naval Base Pearl Harbor, Pearl City, Hawaii, unless noted otherwise.

HAER surveys

HABS surveys

HI-1 through HI-99

HI-100 through HI-149

HI-150 through HI-199

HI-200 through HI-249

HI-250 through HI-299

 (Submarine Memorial Chapel)

HI-300 through HI-349

HI-350 through HI-399

HI-400 through HI-449

HI-450 through HI-499

HI-500 through HI-553

See also
 
 

Pearl Harbor Naval Base
Pearl Harbor Naval Base
LIst of HABS
List of HABS
HABS, Pearl Harbor Naval Base
HABS, Pearl Harbor Naval Base
List of HABS